Hajji Beyk-e Olya (also Romanized as Ḩājjī Beyk-e ‘Olyā and Ḩājjī Beyg-e ‘Olyā; also known as Ḩājjī Beyk-e Bālā, Ājī Beyk, and Hājī Bāi) is a village in Zavkuh Rural District, Pishkamar District, Kalaleh County, Golestan Province, Iran. At the 2006 census, its population was 807, in 146 families.

References 

Populated places in Kalaleh County